Germán Mandarino (born 13 December 1984) is an Argentine professional footballer who plays as a midfielder for Barracas Central.

Career
Mandarino began featuring for General Lamadrid in 2007, as he scored eleven goals in fifty-six appearances in Primera C Metropolitana up until 2009. In early 2009, Mandarino joined Tristán Suárez of Primera B Metropolitana. In the succeeding July, Mandarino was signed by fellow third tier team Acassuso. Eleven goals arrived in his sole season with them, which included a brace in a January 2010 fixture with Brown. On 30 June 2010, Mandarino agreed terms with Primera B Nacional's Almirante Brown. He made the first of thirty appearances for them against CAI on 19 August, with his first goal coming the month after versus Boca Unidos.

In July 2011, Quilmes became Mandarino's fifth senior team. The club won promotion from the 2011–12 Primera B Nacional, with the midfielder subsequently making seventeen appearances in the top-flight in 2012–13; as he also scored against San Lorenzo. Mandarino returned to tier two on 6 July 2013, signing for Huracán. Fifty-six appearances followed in the next two campaigns, which concluded with the club being promoted to the Primera División. However, just one league game came in 2015 and 2016; though he did play in the Copa Libertadores. He also played in the Copa Argentina whilst with them, scoring versus Atlético de Rafaela.

August 2016 saw Mandarino join Primera B Metropolitana side Barracas Central. Mandarino scored six and five goals in his opening two seasons with Barracas Central, while his third campaign culminated with promotion as champions to Primera B Nacional.

Career statistics
.

Honours
Huracán
Copa Argentina: 2013–14

Barracas Central
Primera B Metropolitana: 2018–19

References

External links

1984 births
Living people
People from Morón Partido
Argentine footballers
Association football midfielders
Primera C Metropolitana players
Primera B Metropolitana players
Primera Nacional players
Argentine Primera División players
General Lamadrid footballers
CSyD Tristán Suárez footballers
Club Atlético Acassuso footballers
Club Almirante Brown footballers
Quilmes Atlético Club footballers
Club Atlético Huracán footballers
Barracas Central players
Sportspeople from Buenos Aires Province